Wilma Leona Jackson was an American nurse and military official who served as the third director of the United States Navy Nurse Corps, serving in that position from 1954 to 1958.

Early life and education
Wilma Leona Jackson was born to Roy and Carrie (Furnas) Class in Union, Ohio in 1909. She attended the Butler Centralized School in Vandalia, Ohio, graduating in 1927. In September 1930, she graduated from nurse's training school at Miami Valley Hospital in Dayton, Ohio. She earned a Bachelor of Science and Master of Arts degree in nursing administration from Columbia University.

Career
Leona Jackson was appointed to the United States Navy Nurse Corps on 6 July 1936. She served her first few years, from 1936 until 1939 at the Naval Hospital, Philadelphia, Pennsylvania and then at the Naval Hospital, Brooklyn, New York from 1939 to 1940.

In 1940, then-Ensign Jackson was assigned to the Naval Hospital, Guam, Marianas Islands. In December 1941, two days after Pearl Harbor, the Japanese invaded and took all personnel prisoner. Jackson and three other nurses, under the supervision of Chief Nurse Marian Olds, continued to work at the hospital until they were transported to Japan where they were held as prisoners of war until August 1942 when they were repatriated through Mozambique.

Jackson was promoted to lieutenant (junior grade) in 1943 and then, in 1944, she was assigned to the Navy's Bureau of Medicine and Surgery in Washington, D.C. After her promotion to lieutenant in 1944, she returned to Guam where she was assigned to Fleet Hospital #103. She was the senior nurse corps officer in the Island Command until her transfer in December 1945.

Jackson served as an education officer in the Nursing Section of the Bureau of Medicine and Surgery in 1950 and as a nurse at the Naval Hospital Oakland in 1952. She became the chief nurse of the Naval Medical Center Portsmouth in 1953. She became director of the United States Navy Nurse Corps in 1954 and retired in 1958.

Personal life
Jackson retired to Ohio. She died on 23 March 1998 at the Veteran's Administration Medical Center in Dayton, Ohio, and is buried at Polk Grove Cemetery in Vandalia, Ohio.

Further reading
Leona Jackson. "I Was on Guam". The American Journal of Nursing, Volume 42, Number 11 (November, 1942), pages 1244–1246.
"Nurse Prescribes Navy For Wedding Belles". Stars and Stripes, May 8, 1954.
"New Navy Nurse Director". Stars and Stripes, March 8, 1954.

 Account of the evolution of the roles of women in the United States Navy, treating the parallel and intertwined paths of the Navy Nurse Corps and the WAVES.

References 

1909 births
1998 deaths
American nursing administrators
Columbia University School of Nursing alumni
Female United States Navy nurses in World War II
Female United States Navy officers
United States Navy captains
United States Navy Nurse Corps officers
Teachers College, Columbia University alumni
People from Union, Ohio